Heinz Eichholz (4 January 1927 – 6 April 2001) was a German rower. He competed in the men's coxless pair event at the 1952 Summer Olympics.

References

1927 births
2001 deaths
German male rowers
Olympic rowers of Germany
Rowers at the 1952 Summer Olympics
Sportspeople from Gelsenkirchen